Maria Theresa of Austria (31 July 1816 – 8 August 1867) was the second wife of King Ferdinand II of the Two Sicilies, making her Queen of the Two Sicilies. She was the eldest daughter of Archduke Charles, Duke of Teschen and Princess Henrietta of Nassau-Weilburg.

Maria Theresa was Princess-Abbess of the Theresian Royal and Imperial Ladies Chapter of the Castle of Prague (1834–1835).

Her paternal grandparents were Leopold II, Holy Roman Emperor and Maria Luisa of Spain. Her maternal grandparents were Frederick William of Nassau-Weilburg and his wife Burgravine Louise Isabelle of Kirchberg.

Early life (1816–1837) 
Maria Theresa was born on 31 July 1816 in Vienna, Austria. She was the eldest child of Archduke Charles, Duke of Teschen and Princess Henrietta of Nassau-Weilburg.

On 29 December 1837, Maria Theresa’s mother died after contracting scarlet fever and pneumonia. Maria Theresa took on a motherly role for her siblings.

Queen consort (1837–1859)
On 9 January 1837 in the Augustinian Church in Vienna, Maria Theresa married Ferdinand II of the Two Sicilies. The bride was almost twenty-one years old and the groom twenty-seven. Upon her marriage, Maria Theresa became the Queen consort of the Two Sicilies.

Queen Maria Theresa is described as badly dressed and did not answer to the ideal image of a regal person. She disliked her public role and life at court, and preferred to confine herself in her private rooms dedicated to needlework and her children. She had a good relationship with both her spouse and her stepson Francis: her stepson respected her and she used to demonstratively call him her son. Maria Theresa was interested in politics; she is known to have acted as the king's advisor and to have influenced him to be strict, and when she could not be present at the reception of officials and wished to hear the conversation, she listened to the talk behind the door. She nursed Ferdinand on his death bed.

Queen Dowager (1859–1867)

At the death of her spouse in 1858, she intended to continue her political activity by being the advisor to her stepson Francis, who was the new monarch. Francis was willing, and her authoritarian policy has been considered to contribute to the public discontent which led to the abolishment of the Kingdom of Naples. Francis' spouse Duchess Maria Sophia in Bavaria, however, disputed her influence and Francis had a difficult position in the conflict between his wife and stepmother, without being able to satisfy either. Maria Sophia informed Francis about a plot created by Maria Theresa with the attempt to put the biological son of Maria Theresa on the throne, but Francis chose to believe Maria Theresa when she swore her innocence. It was not until the revolts against the monarchy had already begun that Francis decided to listen to the advice of his wife rather than his stepmother. Maria Theresa was among the first to leave Naples during the revolt: first to Gaeta with her children and advisors, and then to Rome. She resided in the same palace that Francis and Maria Sophia would use when they arrived. She died from cholera, nursed by her stepson Francis, who mourned her greatly.

Issue

Maria Theresa gave birth to twelve children, but only seven of them lived to mature adulthood:

Ancestry

References

External links
.

|-

1816 births
1867 deaths
19th-century Italian women
Nobility from Vienna
House of Habsburg-Lorraine
House of Bourbon-Two Sicilies
Austrian princesses
Royal consorts of the Kingdom of the Two Sicilies
Burials at the Basilica of Santa Chiara
Austrian Roman Catholics
Royal reburials